Darwin's Radio is a 1999 science fiction novel by Greg Bear. It won the Nebula Award in 2000 for Best Novel and the 2000 Endeavour Award. It was also nominated for the Hugo Award, Locus and Campbell Awards the same year.

The novel's original tagline was "The next great war will be inside us." It was followed by a sequel, Darwin's Children, in 2003.

Plot summary
In the novel, a new form of endogenous retrovirus has emerged, SHEVA. It controls human evolution by rapidly evolving the next generation while it is in the womb, leading to speciation.

The novel follows several characters as the "plague" is discovered as well as the panicked reaction of the public and the US government to the disease.

Built into the human genome are non-coding sequences of DNA called introns. Certain portions of those "non-sense" sequences, remnants of prehistoric retroviruses, have been activated and are translating numerous LPCs (large protein complexes). The activation of SHEVA and its consequential sudden speciation was postulated to be controlled by a complex genetic network that perceives a need for modification or to be a human adaptive response to overcrowding. The disease, or rather, gene activation, is passed on laterally from male to female as per an STD. If impregnated, a woman in her first trimester who has contracted SHEVA will miscarry a deformed female fetus made of little more than two ovaries. This "first stage fetus" leaves behind a fertilized egg with 52 chromosomes, rather than the typical 46 characteristic of Homo sapiens sapiens.
            
During the third trimester of the second stage pregnancy, both parents go into a pre-speciation puberty to prepare them for the needs of their novel child. Facial pigmentation changes underneath the old skin which begins sloughing off like a mask. Vocal organs and olfactory glands alter and sensitize respectively, to adapt for a new form of communication. For over a year after the first SHEVA outbreak in the United States, no second stage fetus was recorded to have been born alive. The new human species was highly sensitive to all varieties of herpes and could not be viably born to a mother who had ever been infected with any of the virus' many forms, including Epstein-Barr and the chickenpox, thus eliminating 95% of the female population. Anesthetics and pitocin administered during childbirth were also lethal. So while many women would contract activated SHEVA that few would manage to give birth, making the transition from Homo sapiens sapiens to the new human species very gradual.

The international response to the threat of SHEVA was to form a special task force that would work alongside the Centers for Disease Control and Prevention (CDC) to find a vaccine. Because the "disease", called "Herod's Flu", was already in the genome of every person on Earth, the only two options were to inhibit the activation of the SHEVA gene by discovering the signal it used or to abort the second-stage fetus. Due to the rapid mutation rate of the missing-link signal molecule, preventing the activation of the gene was infeasible.

The second option, abortion, was already a controversial issue and the proposal of handing out free RU 486 was met with social upheaval, adding to the already-chaotic social scene. The general public believed that the government was not placing due importance on the death of countless fetuses or that it already had a cure and refused to release it. In response, government research facilities were forced to test prospective treatments prematurely and could not pursue explanations for SHEVA outside of the "disease" category because of the potential reactions from the masses. It was not until viable second-stage fetuses were born that the idea of SHEVA being a part of evolution rather than a disease began to grow from a few isolated sources.

References

External links

1999 American novels
1999 science fiction novels
American science fiction novels
Endeavour Award-winning works
Nebula Award for Best Novel-winning works
Novels by Greg Bear
Del Rey books
Biopunk novels
Evolution in popular culture
Fiction about neanderthals
Novels about viral outbreaks